Andreas Seewald (born 21 August 1991) is a German cross-country mountain biker. He won the 2021 UCI Mountain Bike Marathon World Championships.

Major results
2017
 UCI MTB Marathon Series
1st La Forestiere
1st Montafon
2018
 UCI MTB Marathon Series
1st La Forestiere
1st Grand Raid BCVS
2021
 1st  Marathon, UCI World Championships
 1st  Marathon, UEC European Championships
 1st Overall UCI MTB Marathon Series
1st Roc d'Azur
1st Hero Südtirol Dolomites
1st La Forestiere
1st Grand Raid BCVS
2022
 1st  Marathon, National Championships
 2nd  Marathon, UCI World Championships
 2nd Overall Cape Epic (with Martin Stošek)
 UCI MTB Marathon Series
1st Jaén and Córdoba
1st Verbier
1st Jelenia Góra
3rd Roc d'Azur

References

External links
 
 

1991 births
Living people
Austrian male cyclists
UCI Mountain Bike World Champions (men)
German mountain bikers
Cross-country mountain bikers